Folklore is a television horror anthology series that premiered on HBO Asia on October 7, 2018. On December 1, 2020, it was renewed for a second season.

Premise
Created by Singaporean director Eric Khoo, the six-episode series features stories based on Asian superstitions and national folkloric myths, with each episode helmed by a director from a different country.

Episodes

Series overview

Season 1 (2018)

Season 2 (2021)

Production

Development
Episodes were directed by Khoo, Joko Anwar, Pen-Ek Ratanaruang, Takumi Saitoh, Lee Sang-woo and Ho Yuhang.

Casting
Kim Yoo-jung was offered a role in the South Korean episode.

Release

Season 1
All six episodes of the series have received preview screenings at various film festivals in advance of the television premiere. Anwar's "A Mother's Love" and Ratanaruang's "Pob" received a preview screening at the 2018 Toronto International Film Festival as part of its Primetime stream of selected television projects. Another two episodes, Saitoh's "Tatami" and Khoo's "Nobody", received a preview screening at the 2018 Sitges Film Festival as part of Serial Sitges section, while Ho's "Toyol" and Lee's "Mongdal" were screened at the 2018 Fantastic Fest in Austin as part of Folklore program.

The Indonesian episode had its West Coast premiere on November 14, 2018 at 19th annual San Diego Asian Film Festival.

The extended version of the South Korean episode would have its world premiere at the 23rd annual Bucheon International Fantastic Film Festival as part of "Korean Fantastic: Crossover" section. However, it was canceled due to circumstances of the production company.

Season 2
The two of six episodes of the season had world premiere at 2021 Tokyo International Film Festival as part of "TIFF Series". Woodford's "The Excursion" and Matsuda's "The Day the Wind Blew" were screened at Humantrust Cinema, Yūrakuchō on November 4, 2021.

References

External links
 
 
 
 
 
 
 
 

2018 Indonesian television series debuts
2018 Japanese television series debuts
2018 Thai television series debuts
2021 Indonesian television series endings
2021 Japanese television series endings
2021 Thai television series endings
2018 Malaysian television series debuts
2022 Malaysian television series endings
2018 Singaporean television series debuts
2021 Philippine television series debuts
2021 Taiwanese television series debuts
2021 Singaporean television series endings
2021 Philippine television series endings
2021 Taiwanese television series endings
2010s anthology television series
HBO Asia original programming
Horror fiction television series